Corpse flower can refer to:
 Amorphophallus titanum, species, also known as the Titan arum, which has the largest unbranched inflorescence in the world
 Carrion flowers or stinking flowers, any flower that emits an odor that smells like rotting flesh
 Rafflesia, plant genus containing the species Rafflesia arnoldii, the largest single flower on Earth
 Corpse Flower, 2019 – Collaboration album of Mike Patton and Jean-Claude Vannier.